The half-collared sparrow (Arremon semitorquatus) is a species of bird in the family Passerellidae.
It is endemic to southeastern Brazil.

Its natural habitats are subtropical or tropical moist lowland forest and heavily degraded former forest.

References

half-collared sparrow
Birds of the Atlantic Forest
Endemic birds of Brazil
half-collared sparrow
Taxonomy articles created by Polbot